North Fork Cross Creek is a  long 3rd order tributary to Cross Creek in Washington County, Pennsylvania. This is the only stream of this name in the United States.

Course
North Fork Cross Creek rises about 0.5 miles west of Langeloth in Washington County and then flows south-southwest to join Cross Creek at Avella.

Watershed
North Fork Cross Creek drains  of area, receives about 40.4 in/year of precipitation, has a wetness index of 334.43, and is about 53% forested.

See also
List of Rivers of Pennsylvania

References

Rivers of Pennsylvania
Rivers of Washington County, Pennsylvania